The men's 400 metres event at the 1996 Summer Olympics in Atlanta, Georgia took place between 26 and 29 July. There were 62 competitors from 42 countries. The maximum number of athletes per nation had been set at 3 since the 1930 Olympic Congress. 

The event was won by Michael Johnson of the United States. A few days later, Johnson would become the only man to win both the 400 metres and the 200 metres in the same Olympics. Johnson's 400 metres victory in Atlanta was the first of his two wins; he would become the only man to repeat as gold medalist in the event when he won again in 2000. More generally, his win was the fourth in what would ultimately be 7 consecutive American victories stretching from 1984 to 2008 and the 16th overall title in the event by the United States. Roger Black's silver medal was Great Britain's first in the event since 1936; Davis Kamoga's bronze was Uganda's first in the event ever.

Background

This was the 23rd appearance of the event, which is one of 12 athletics events to have been held at every Summer Olympics. The only two finalists from 1992 to return were bronze medalist Samson Kitur of Kenya and seventh-place finisher Ibrahim Ismail Muftah of Qatar. Michael Johnson of the United States was the clear favorite, having won the last two world championships. His countryman Butch Reynolds had come in second both times, as well as having won silver in the 1988 Olympics. Roger Black of Great Britain, 1991 world championship runner-up, 1986 and 1990 European champion, and 1994 European runner-up, was probably the strongest non-American challenger.

Algeria, Comoros, Cyprus, Saint Lucia, Slovakia, Sri Lanka, and Yemen appeared in this event for the first time. The United States made its 22nd appearance, most of any nation, having missed only the boycotted 1980 Games.

Competition format

The competition retained the basic four-round format from 1920. The "fastest loser" system, introduced in 1964, was used for the first round. There were 8 first-round heats, each with 7 or 8 runners. The top three runners in each heat advanced, along with the next eight fastest overall (in contrast to previous instances where there were 8 heats, which used a top-four with no-fastest-loser rule). The 32 quarterfinalists were divided into 4 quarterfinals with 8 runners each; the top four athletes in each quarterfinal heat advanced to the semifinals, with no "fastest loser" spots. The semifinals featured 2 heats of 8 runners each. The top four runners in each semifinal heat advanced, making an eight-man final.

Records

These were the standing world and Olympic records (in seconds) prior to the 1996 Summer Olympics.

In the final Michael Johnson set a new Olympic record by 0.01 seconds with 43.49 seconds.

Schedule

Following the 1984 schedule, the event was held on four separate days, with each round being on a different day. 

All times are Eastern Daylight Time (UTC-4)

Results

Round 1

Heat 1

Heat 2

Heat 3

Heat 4

Heat 5

Heat 6

Heat 7

Heat 8

Eliminated in heats

Ranks are unofficial.

Quarterfinals

The quarterfinals were held on 27 July 1996. The top four in each heat advanced to the semifinals.

Quarterfinal 1

Quarterfinal 2

Quarterfinal 3

Quarterfinal 4

Eliminated in quarterfinals

Ranks are unofficial.

Semifinals

The semifinals were held on 28 July 1996. The top four in each heat advanced to the final.

Semifinal 1

Semifinal 2

Eliminated in semifinals

Ranks are unofficial.

Final

The final was held on 29 July 1996.

See also
Women's 400 metres

References

External links
 Official Report
 Results

4
400 metres at the Olympics
Men's events at the 1996 Summer Olympics